Engines of War is a BBC Books original novel written by George Mann and based on the long-running British science fiction television series Doctor Who. It features the War Doctor.

Synopsis
During the Great Time War, the War Doctor and a Time Lord battle fleet attack Dalek Saucers above the planet Moldox. The fleet is destroyed and the TARDIS crashes to the planet below, where the Doctor meets human resistance fighter Cinder, a young woman whose family were killed by the Daleks when she was a child. The Doctor learns that the Eternity Circle, a group of Daleks created by the Dalek Emperor, have produced temporal weapons which they plan to use against the Time Lords, removing them from History. Travelling to Gallifrey to warn the Time Lords, he finds them preparing to counter-attack using a weapon that will cause the death of billions, Dalek and non-Dalek alike. Vowing to stop both the Time Lords and the Daleks, the Doctor must avoid being killed by a Time Lord assassin and confront the Eternity Circle as he seeks to bring the war to an end and prevent his people from becoming as evil as the Daleks themselves.

Continuity
The Doctor recalls that he had the chance to prevent the creation of the Daleks, referencing the television serial Genesis of the Daleks (1975).
The Skaro Degradations, referred to by the Tenth Doctor in "The End of Time" (2009/2010), feature in the story.
The Daleks refer to the Doctor as "the Predator", first heard in "Asylum of the Daleks" (2012).
The Time Lord High Council refer to their having a weapon called "The Moment", which appeared in the television episode "The Day of the Doctor" (2013).

Audiobook

An unabridged audiobook version of Engines of War, read by Nicholas Briggs, was released on 18 December 2014.

See also
Whoniverse

References

External links

Reviews
Engines of War reviewed at Slice of Scifi
 Engines of War reviewed at Cultbox

War Doctor stories
Dalek novels
British science fiction novels
2014 British novels
Novels by George Mann (writer)
BBC Books books